Walter James Bayola (born May 3, 1972), popularly known as Wally Bayola, is a Filipino comedian and actor. He is best known for portraying Lola Nidora (sometimes Duhrizz, Rihanna and Doktora the Explorer) in the Kalyeserye portion of the noontime television variety show Eat Bulaga!. He appears alongside his co-hosts Jose Manalo and Paolo Ballesteros, the trio also known as JoWaPao, in the "Juan for All, All for Juan" segment of the said show.

Career
Bayola started working with Jose Manalo on Eat Bulaga! as a comedian in the early 2000s.

In 2011, Bayola became part of a new TV5 comedy show, The Jose & Wally Show Starring Vic Sotto, together with his co-stars Jose Manalo, Vic Sotto and Jimmy Santos. Bayola also starred in Star Cinema films with Vic Sotto titled Pak! Pak! My Dr. Kwak! and the Metro Manila Film Festival film entry Enteng ng Ina Mo. In 2011, Bayola also appeared in ABS-CBN shows like The Buzz and ASAP for the promotion of their film.

On March 2, 2012, Bayola and his co-tandem Manalo had their first solo concert, 'Jose and Wally Show: A Party for Juan and All' at the Smart Araneta Coliseum.

In 2013, Bayola, together with Jose Manalo had their second concert at the Smart Araneta Coliseum which was a success.

He won the Best Supporting Actor award at the 2014 Dabarkads Awards.

He regularly performs in Klownz and Zirkoh Comedy Bars with Jerricho Sison Calingal a.k.a. Echo (Eat Bulaga's BakClash Diva Grand Winner).

Juan for All, All for Juan: Kalyeserye/Sunday Pinasaya

After his return on Eat Bulaga!, Bayola became known for his roles as Doktora Dora de Explorer on Eat Bulaga!'s Juan for All, All for Juan: Problem Solving and as Donya Nidora Esperanza Zobeyala de Explorer (Lola Nidora), Duhrizz de Explorer (Duh) and Rihanna (a mayordoma at Nidoras' mansion) on the Kalyeserye segment. Bayola was also part of Sunday noontime comedy-variety show Sunday PinaSaya along with Jose Manalo, Marian Rivera and Comedy Queen Ai-Ai delas Alas.

Controversy
On September 2, 2013, a video showing Bayola and "EB Babe" Yosh Rivera engaging in sexual intercourse, was uploaded on YouTube. The video was immediately removed from the site but already went viral in several social media channels, including Facebook. After the scandal became known, it was reported that Bayola would not be appearing on Eat Bulaga! temporarily, as stated by his manager, Malou Choa Fagar who said the comedian "will lie low from the program". Rivera has not appeared on Eat Bulaga! since, and Bayola did not reappear until five months later on February 8, 2014, when he made an appearance on that day only during the "Juan for All, All for Juan" segment. Bayola has since returned full-time and is currently a host on Eat Bulaga!.

Filmography

Television

Film

Awards and nominations

References

External links

1972 births
Living people
Bicolano actors
People from Naga, Camarines Sur
Male actors from Camarines Sur
Filipino male comedians
GMA Network personalities
Filipino television variety show hosts
Filipino television talk show hosts
TV5 (Philippine TV network) personalities